CB Smith Reserve is a football facility based in Fawkner, Victoria, a suburb 12 km north of the centre of Melbourne. The venue is home to the Pascoe Vale Soccer Club and Brunswick Juventus  who compete in the  National Premier Leagues Victoria 2, as well as State League side Fawkner SC as principle tenant. The venue also hosted home games for Melbourne City FC in the national W-League competition between 2014 and 2019.

The venue was redeveloped at a cost of $6.3 million in late 2014 and early 2015, featuring new and improved club rooms, a high quality pitch and a covered grandstand seating up to 500 people. The total capacity is around 2,000 and the venue and broader facility is owned by the City of Moreland.

References

Soccer venues in Melbourne
Sports venues in Melbourne
Melbourne City FC (A-League Women)
A-League Women stadiums
Buildings and structures in the City of Merri-bek
Sport in the City of Merri-bek